Bruce Fletcher Snyder (March 14, 1940 – April 13, 2009) was an American football player and coach. After playing college football at the University of Oregon in the early 1960s as a fullback, Snyder embarked on a coaching career.

Snyder's 58 wins and nine-year tenure as head coach at Arizona State each rank second in school history to marks set by Frank Kush, who coached the Sun Devils from 1958 to 1979 and won 173 games. Snyder led ASU to four bowl games including a win in the 1997 Sun Bowl. More than 40 ASU players coached by Snyder were selected in the National Football League Draft, including seven in the first round, and more than 40 others signed free agent contracts in the National Football League (NFL). After his stint at Arizona State, Snyder assisted long-time friend John Robinson at UNLV for one season in 2003. He also served under Robinson as an assistant coach from 1983 to 1986 for the Los Angeles Rams of the National Football League (NFL).

Snyder was twice named Pac-10 Coach of the Year, in 1990 with Cal and in 1996 with Arizona State. He is a member of the Arizona State Hall of Fame. His best Sun Devil team was the 1996 unit. With Jake Plummer at quarterback, Snyder led ASU to an 11–1 record. The Sun Devils stunned the top-ranked and two-time defending national champion Nebraska Cornhuskers in the season's second game. Arizona State reeled off the third undefeated regular season in school history en route 1997 Rose Bowl, where they came within 19 seconds of a victory over Ohio State. Had they won, the Sun Devils would have likely won at least a share of the national championship, as they would have been the only undefeated major-conference team in the nation. For his efforts that season, Snyder won a number of national coaching awards, including the Paul "Bear" Bryant Award and the Walter Camp Coach of the Year Award.

Snyder was diagnosed with Stage IV melanoma in June 2008. He died less than a year later on April 13, 2009, at his home in Phoenix.

Head coaching record

References

External links
 Arizona State profile

1940 births
2009 deaths
Arizona State Sun Devils football coaches
California Golden Bears football coaches
Los Angeles Rams coaches
Oregon Ducks football coaches
Oregon Ducks football players
USC Trojans football coaches
Utah State Aggies football coaches
UNLV Rebels football coaches
Deaths from cancer in Arizona
Deaths from melanoma